UFC 52: Couture vs. Liddell 2 was a mixed martial arts event held by the Ultimate Fighting Championship on April 16, 2005, at the MGM Grand Arena in Las Vegas, Nevada. The event was broadcast live on pay-per-view in the United States and Canada, and later released on DVD.

History
Headlining the card were the coaches of The Ultimate Fighter, Randy Couture and Chuck Liddell. At the time, it was the highest-grossing UFC event ever at the live gate, with $2,575,450 in ticket sales. Dan "The Beast" Severn was inducted into the UFC Hall of Fame at this event.

The total fighter payroll for UFC 52 was $519,500.

The rematch bout between Matt Hughes and Frank Trigg for the Welterweight title is one of president of the UFC Dana White's favorite fights. In 2015 during International Fight Week, this became the second fight to be inducted into the UFC Hall of Fame.

Results

See also
 Ultimate Fighting Championship
 List of UFC champions
 List of UFC events
 2005 in UFC

References

External links
 UFC 52: Couture vs. Liddell 2 Results on Sherdog.com
 Fights review
 "Ultimate Fighting Championship Cards" on Wrestling Information Archives
 UFC PPV Buys Explode in 2006 (includes information on UFC 52's PPV buyrate)
 Fighter Salaries for UFC 52

Ultimate Fighting Championship events
2005 in mixed martial arts
Mixed martial arts in Las Vegas
2005 in sports in Nevada
MGM Grand Garden Arena